The Knockout Stage of the 2002 Fed Cup Europe/Africa Zone Group I was the final stage of the Zonal Competition involving teams from Europe and Africa. Using the positions determined in their pools, the fourteen teams were divided into four different knock-out sections, with the four winners advancing to Group I next year.

Draw

First round

Lithuania vs. Egypt

Latvia vs. Botswana

South Africa vs. Malta

Tunisia vs. Finland

Ireland vs. Liechtenstein

Algeria vs. Norway

Finals

Great Britain vs. Lithuania

  advanced to Group I for 2003, where they placed fourth in their pool of five.

Denmark vs. Latvia

  advanced to Group I for 2003, where they placed third in their pool of four.

South Africa vs. Finland

Ireland vs. Algeria

  advanced to Group I for 2003, where they placed last in their pool of five and thus was relegated back to Group II for 2004.

See also
Fed Cup structure

References

External links
 Fed Cup website

2002 Fed Cup Europe/Africa Zone